Vaccine (Christine Clements) is a female dubstep record producer based in California, United States. She was one of the first women signed to a dubstep related record label (Hotflush Recordings), which was up until then, a genre whose producers were almost entirely male.

Before she started producing, she was promoting other people's music.

Vaccine's style has been recognised as being considerably more melodic and ethereal, with XLR8R magazine noting her "subtle melodies and echoed vocals", as well as stating that "(Vaccine's) constructions aren't necessarily main floor rave fodder, but rather, comedown music for a 6 a.m. all-back-to-mine", as well as mentioning "jittery electronic elements with gothic ambient nuances."

Clements is a self-described Skinny Puppy and Portishead fan. Her influences are "Nine Inch Nails, Dom & Roland, Skinny Puppy, The Prodigy, Technical Itch, Sasha and Digweed, Future Sound of London, Akira Yamaoka, Helios, Harold Budd, Surgeon, Zero 7, Portishead, Massive Attack, Tricky, friends, lovers, label mates, colors, sounds, places, feelings."

In 2014, she released the Decryption EP on ASC's label, Auxiliary Transmissions.

Discography
 "Wishful Thinking" / "Signal to Noise" 12" (Hotflush Recordings / Scuba 006, 2007)
 "Anaesthetic" / "Destroy" 12" (Hotflush Recordings HFO15ii, 2007)
 "Breathless" / "Side Effects" 12" (Hotflush Recordings HFO 17, 2007)
 "Fever" / "Wishful Thinking VIP" CD (Hotflush Recordings HFCD001, 2007)
 "Fever" (high grade mix) / "Concussion" 12" (Vaccine Recordings 002, 2008)
 "Skadi (Vaccine Dubstep Remix)" (Subtle Audio, 2009)
 "Sweet Spot" / "Radiate" 12" (Offshore Recordings OSR022, 2009)
 "Ochre" / "Cascade Failure" 12" (Nonplus Records NONPLUS 007, 2010)
 "68 (Vaccine Remix)" File (Car Crash Set C/C/S2018, 2011)
 "The Axiom (Vaccine Remix)" 12" (The Agriculture AG053, 2011)
 "Machines" 12" (Samurai Red Seal REDSEAL006, 2011)
 "Irradiate" 12" (Veil VEILUN001, 2013)

References

External links
Vaccine on Myspace
Vaccine in Timeout London, June 2008
Vaccine on Discogs
Vaccine on Hotflush Recordings

Dubstep musicians
American dance musicians
American electronic musicians
American techno musicians
Living people
Year of birth missing (living people)
American women in electronic music
Hotflush Recordings artists
21st-century American women musicians